Swarabhishekam is a 2004 Indian Telugu-language musical drama film written and directed by K. Viswanath. Viswanath also played the lead role, along with Srikanth, Sivaji, Urvashi, and Laya. Vidyasagar won the National Film Award for Best Music Direction. The film has garnered the National Film Award for Best Feature Film in Telugu for that year.

Plot 
Srirangam Brothers – Srinivasachari (K Viswanath) and Ranga (Srikanth) – are versatile Carnatic musicians. Srinivasachari is happily married but has no children. Ranga is a widower with two children. Srirangam Brothers are the biggest music directors in the Telugu film industry (Tollywood) and compose music for only traditional and classical genres. Srirangam Brothers always try to help aspiring singers in their music compositions. Surekha (Laya),  a TV anchor, falls in love with Ranga and they get married.

After marriage, Surekha, who initially respects her brother-in-law, starts to develop ill feelings towards him and becomes envious that even though her husband Ranga is the main factor for the music duo's success and has equal contribution in Srirangam Brothers music scores, Srinivasachari is the one who gets all the credit.

When Srinivasachari is awarded the Padmasri by the Government of India, Surekha rejects her sister's gifted saree and shows no inclination to come along with her family to attend Srinivasachari's felicitation by the President. Also, Surekha starts to show her hostile and disrespectful behavior towards Srinivasachari.

This situation provokes Srinivasachari who starts behaving unpredictably and lashes out at a film producer about his brother's music compositions (during his music sitting) and also at the media. When Ranga in his office becomes aware of this situation through the film producer, he returns home only to get dispirited to see Ranga's sister-in-law getting slapped by her husband, which leads to a heated argument between the two brothers and the family gets separated.

Surekha slowly understands Srinivasachari's and Ranga's music calibre and realizes that the two brothers can only excel in their music when they stay united. This transformation in Surekha eventually leads to the unity of the family just like Srirangam Brothers' different blends excel when they compose their music together.

Cast 

 Srikanth as Ranga
Sivaji as Chandu 
Urvashi as Rukminiamma
Laya as Surekha
K. Viswanath as Srinivasachari
Amukta Malyada as Bujji 
Naresh
Sana as a beautician
M. S. Narayana
Dubbing Janaki as Chandu's blind mother
Rajiv Kanakala
Sridhar as a cobbler
 Sakshi Ranga Rao
 Jaya Lakshmi
 Surekha Vani
Gundu Hanumantha Rao as an auto rickshaw driver
Jayalalita
 Anant as a stainless steel container seller
 Suma as a news reporter
Venu Madhav as a music director
Ashok Kumar
Junior Relangi

Soundtrack 

The audio soundtrack for Swarabhishekam was composed by Vidyasagar.

Awards 
National Film Awards
 Best Feature Film in Telugu – K. Viswanath
 Best Music Direction – Vidyasagar
Nandi Awards
 Best Music Director – Vidyasagar

References

External links 

2000s musical drama films
2000s Telugu-language films
2004 films
Best Telugu Feature Film National Film Award winners
Films about classical music and musicians
Films about the arts
Films directed by K. Viswanath
Films scored by Vidyasagar
Indian musical drama films